Rhinella justinianoi is a species of toad in the family Bufonidae that is endemic to Bolivia. Its natural habitats are subtropical or tropical moist montane forests and rivers. It is threatened by habitat loss.

References

justinianoi
Amphibians described in 1994
Amphibians of Bolivia
Endemic fauna of Bolivia
Taxonomy articles created by Polbot